The Knights of Castelcorvo is an Italian comedy-drama-mystery-fantasy streaming television series for children and adolescents, which is produced by Stand by Me for the Walt Disney Company. The series premiered on November 6, 2020 in Italy on Disney+.

Plot 
In the Italian countryside, far from the well-trod paths, lies the small village of Castelcorvo. An imposing and ancient castle mounts over this tiny town where life flows slowly and everyone knows everybody. A still miniature place, isn’t it? Not at all. Among the cobbled streets and colourful little houses witches and other frightening magical beings lie low. And, above all, is the old manor really uninhabited or is it hiding mysteries and secrets only a group of brave people can reveal?  Castelcorvo is not as peaceful and to keep it safe brave Knights are called to defend it. Four kids - Giulia, Riccardo, Betta and Matteo - will have to solve puzzles and face their greatest fears to grow up, live a huge adventure and become the paladins fighting the evil that lurks in Castelcorvo.

Cast 
 Fabio Bizarro as Riccardo 
 Mario Luciani as Matteo
 Margherita Rebbeggiani as Betta
 Lucrezia Santi as Giulia
 Giada Prandi as Aunt Margherita
 Angela Tuccia as Stria
 Gabriele Rizzoli as Zeno
 Gabriele Scopel as Andrea
 Susanna Marcomeni as Atena
 Eleonora Siro as Mother of Giulia and Riccardo
 Maximiliano Gigliucci as Father of Giulia and Riccardo 
 Alessandro Cannava as Aldo
 Andrea Paretti as Bully #1 
 Mattia Spera as Bully #2

Episodes

References

External links
 
 

Television shows filmed in Italy
2020s Italian television series
Italian-language television shows
Comedy-drama television series
Mystery television series
Fantasy television series
Adventure television series
Disney+ original programming